Plaban 1988 Padak (Bengali: প্লাবন ১৯৮৮ পদক), is a military medal of Bangladesh. The medal was established in 1988. The medal is intended for awarding servicemen who took part in the liquidation of the consequences of the flood of 1988.

References 

Military awards and decorations of Bangladesh